Alizé Mack (born Alizé Jones; March 29, 1997) is an American football tight end for the San Antonio Brahmas of the XFL. He played college football at Notre Dame.

High school
Mack attended Bishop Gorman High School in Summerlin, Nevada, where he went by Alizé Jones. He finished his high school career with 85 receptions for 1,725 yards and 27 TDs. In his senior year he was named to the U.S. Army All-American Bowl, USA Today All-USA First-team and First-team All-State after ending the season with 41 receptions, 930 yards and 13 TDs. At Bishop Gorman, Mack was teammates with fellow future Notre Dame football player Nicco Fertitta.

Considered a four-star recruit by Rivals.com, he was rated as the 4th best tight end prospect of his class. He had previously been committed to UCLA, but flipped his commitment to Notre Dame.

College career

Freshman
After impressing coaches with his excellent pass catching ability, Mack quickly found a spot in Notre Dame's passing game. Mack made the most of his targeted passes, ending the season with just over 15 yards per catch, including three receptions over 30 yards. Mack came up big for the Irish in critical moments against both Temple and USC. Late in the game against USC, Mack had a clutch 35-yard catch-and-run deep into USC territory, which set up a tie-breaking touchdown. This, plus other timely plays in critical situations, quickly established Mack as a dependable player.

Professional career

New Orleans Saints
Mack was drafted by the New Orleans Saints in the seventh round (231st overall) of the 2019 NFL Draft. He was waived on August 31, 2019, and was signed to the practice squad the next day. He was released on September 20, 2019.

Pittsburgh Steelers
On September 25, 2019, Mack was signed to the Pittsburgh Steelers practice squad. He was released on October 2, 2019.

Kansas City Chiefs
On November 6, 2019, Mack was signed to the Kansas City Chiefs practice squad. He was released on November 30. He signed a reserve/future contract with the Chiefs on January 9, 2020. He was waived on May 4, 2020.

Detroit Lions
On February 11, 2021, Mack signed with the Detroit Lions. He was waived on August 31, 2021, and re-signed to the practice squad the next day, but released the following day.

Green Bay Packers
On February 7, 2022, Mack signed with the Green Bay Packers. He was waived/injured on August 30, 2022 and placed on injured reserve. He was released off injured reserve on September 2, 2022.

San Antonio Brahmas 
On November 17, 2022, Mack was drafted by the San Antonio Brahmas of the XFL.

References

External links
Green Bay Packers bio
Notre Dame Fighting Irish bio

1997 births
Living people
Players of American football from Nevada
Sportspeople from Las Vegas
American football tight ends
Bishop Gorman High School alumni
Notre Dame Fighting Irish football players
New Orleans Saints players
Pittsburgh Steelers players
Kansas City Chiefs players
Detroit Lions players
Green Bay Packers players
San Antonio Brahmas players